Diwali, also known as the Festival of Lights, is one of the most important festivals in Indian religions. It symbolises the spiritual "victory of light over darkness, good over evil, and knowledge over ignorance".  The festival is widely associated with conflagrations between good and evil entities. 

Diwali is a post-harvest festival celebrating the bounty following the arrival of the monsoon in the subcontinent.  It is celebrated during the Hindu lunisolar months of Ashvin (according to the amanta tradition) and Kartika (between mid-October and mid-November). In Hinduism it generally lasts five or six days.

Diwali is connected to various religious mythical events or personalities. The day Rama returned to his kingdom in Ayodhya with his wife Sita and his brother Lakshmana after defeating the demon Ravana. Birth of Lakshmi (goddess of prosperity). Ganesha (god of wisdom and the remover of obstacles). Other regional traditions connects the holiday to Sita and Rama, Vishnu, Krishna, Durga, Shiva, Kali, Hanuman, Kubera, Yama, Yami, Dhanvantari, or Vishvakarman.  

During the festival, Hindus, Jains and Sikhs illuminate their homes, temples and workspaces with diyas (oil lamps), candles and lanterns Hindus, in particular, have a ritual oil bath at dawn on each day of the festival. Diwali is also marked with fireworks and the decoration of floors with rangoli designs, and other parts of the house with jhalars. Food is a major focus with families partaking in feasts and sharing mithai.

The festival is an annual homecoming and bonding period not only for families, but also for communities and associations, particularly those in urban areas, which will organise activities, events and gatherings. Many towns organise community parades and fairs with parades or music and dance performances in parks. Some Hindus, Jains and Sikhs will send Diwali greeting cards to family near and far during the festive season, occasionally with boxes of Indian confectionery. Another aspect of the festival is remembering the ancestors.

Originally a Hindu festival, Diwali is now also celebrated by other faiths. The Jains observe their own Diwali which marks the final liberation of Mahavira, the Sikhs celebrate Bandi Chhor Divas to mark the release of Guru Hargobind from a Mughal prison. Newar Buddhists, unlike other Buddhists, celebrate Diwali by worshipping Lakshmi, while the Hindus of Eastern India and Bangladesh generally celebrate Diwali by worshipping the goddess Kali.

Diwali is also a major cultural event for the Hindu, Sikh, and Jain diaspora. The main day of the festival of Diwali (the day of Lakshmi Puja) is an official holiday in Fiji, Guyana, India, Malaysia, Mauritius, Myanmar, Nepal, Pakistan, Singapore, Sri Lanka, Suriname, and Trinidad and Tobago.

Etymology

Diwalialso known as Dewali, Divali, or Deepavali (IAST: dīpāvalī)comes from the Sanskrit dīpāvali meaning "row or series of lights". The term is derived from the Sanskrit words dīpa, "lamp, light, lantern, candle, that which glows, shines, illuminates or knowledge" and āvali, "a row, range, continuous line, series".

Dates 
The five-day celebration is observed every year in early autumn after the conclusion of the summer harvest. It coincides with the new moon (amāvasyā) and is deemed the darkest night of the Hindu lunisolar calendar. The festivities begin two days before amāvasyā, on Dhanteras, and extend two days after, until the second (or 17th) day of the month of Kartik. (According to Indologist Constance Jones, this night ends the lunar month of Ashwin and starts the month of Kartik – but see this note and Amanta and Purnima systems.) The darkest night is the apex of the celebration and coincides with the second half of October or early November in the Gregorian calendar.
The festival climax is on the third day and is called the main Diwali. It is an official holiday in a dozen countries, while the other festive days are regionally observed as either public or optional restricted holidays in India. In Nepal, it is also a multiday festival, although the days and rituals are named differently, with the climax being called the Tihar festival by Hindus and Swanti festival by Buddhists.

History
The five-day long festival originated in the Indian subcontinent and is likely a fusion of harvest festivals in ancient India. It is mentioned in early Sanskrit texts, such as the Padma Purana and the Skanda Purana, both of which were completed in the second half of the 1st millennium CE. The diyas (lamps) are mentioned in Skanda Kishore Purana as symbolising parts of the sun, describing it as the cosmic giver of light and energy to all life and which seasonally transitions in the Hindu calendar month of Kartik.

Emperor Harsha refers to Deepavali, in the 7th-century Sanskrit play Nagananda, as Dīpapratipadotsava (dīpa = light, pratipadā = first day, utsava = festival), where lamps were lit and newly engaged brides and grooms received gifts. Rajasekhara referred to Deepavali as Dipamalika in his 9th-century Kavyamimamsa, wherein he mentions the tradition of homes being whitewashed and oil lamps decorated homes, streets and markets in the night.

Diwali was also described by numerous travelers from outside India. In his 11th-century memoir on India, the Persian traveler and historian Al Biruni wrote of Deepavali being celebrated by Hindus on the day of the New Moon in the month of Kartika. The Venetian merchant and traveler Niccolò de' Conti visited India in the early 15th-century and wrote in his memoir, "on another of these festivals they fix up within their temples, and on the outside of the roofs, an innumerable number of oil lamps... which are kept burning day and night" and that the families would gather, "clothe themselves in new garments", sing, dance and feast. The 16th-century Portuguese traveler Domingo Paes wrote of his visit to the Hindu Vijayanagara Empire, where Dipavali was celebrated in October with householders illuminating their homes, and their temples, with lamps. It is mentioned in the Ramayana that Diwali was celebrated for only 2 years in Ayodhya.

Islamic historians of the Delhi Sultanate and the Mughal Empire era also mentioned Diwali and other Hindu festivals. A few, notably the Mughal emperor Akbar, welcomed and participated in the festivities, whereas others banned such festivals as Diwali and Holi, as Aurangzeb did in 1665.

Publications from the British colonial era also made mention of Diwali, such as the note on Hindu festivals published in 1799 by Sir William Jones, a philologist known for his early observations on Sanskrit and Indo-European languages. In his paper on The Lunar Year of the Hindus, Jones, then based in Bengal, noted four of the five days of Diwali in the autumn months of Aswina-Cartica  as the following: Bhutachaturdasi Yamaterpanam (2nd day), Lacshmipuja dipanwita (the day of Diwali), Dyuta pratipat Belipuja (4th day), and Bhratri dwitiya (5th day). The Lacshmipuja dipanwita, remarked Jones, was a "great festival at night, in honour of Lakshmi, with illuminations on trees and houses".

Epigraphy

Sanskrit inscriptions in stone and copper mentioning Diwali, occasionally alongside terms such as Dipotsava, Dipavali, Divali and Divalige, have been discovered at numerous sites across India. Examples include a 10th-century Rashtrakuta empire copper plate inscription of Krishna III (939–967 CE) that mentions Dipotsava, and a 12th-century mixed Sanskrit-Kannada Sinda inscription discovered in the Isvara temple of Dharwad in Karnataka where the inscription refers to the festival as a "sacred occasion". According to Lorenz Franz Kielhorn, a German Indologist known for translating many Indic inscriptions, this festival is mentioned as Dipotsavam in verses 6 and 7 of the Ranganatha temple Sanskrit inscription of the 13th-century Venad Hindu king Ravivarman Samgramadhira. Part of the inscription, as translated by Kielhorn, reads: "the auspicious festival of lights which disperses the most profound darkness, which in former days was celebrated by the kings Ila, Kartavirya and Sagara, (...) as Sakra (Indra) is of the gods, the universal monarch who knows the duties by the three Vedas, afterwards celebrated here at Ranga for Vishnu, resplendent with Lakshmi resting on his radiant lap."

Jain inscriptions, such as the 10th-century Saundatti inscription about a donation of oil to Jinendra worship for the Diwali rituals, speak of Dipotsava. Another early 13th-century Sanskrit stone inscription, written in the Devanagari script, has been found in the north end of a mosque pillar in Jalore, Rajasthan evidently built using materials from a demolished Jain temple. The inscription states that Ramachandracharya built and dedicated a drama performance hall, with a golden cupola, on Diwali.

Religious significance

The religious significance of Diwali varies regionally within India. 
One tradition links the festival to legends in the Hindu epic Ramayana, where Diwali is the day Rama, Sita, Lakshman and Hanuman reached Ayodhya after a period of 14 years in exile after Rama's army of good defeated demon king Ravana's army of evil. Throughout the epic, Rama's decisions were always in line with dharma (duty) and the Diwali festival serves as a reminder for followers of hinduism to maintain their dharma in day to day life.

Per another popular tradition, in the Dvapara Yuga period, Krishna, an avatar of Vishnu, killed the demon Narakasura, who was the evil king of Pragjyotishapura, near present-day Assam, and released 16000 girls held captive by Narakasura. Diwali was celebrated as a signifier of triumph of good over evil after Krishna's Victory over Narakasura. The day before Diwali is remembered as Naraka Chaturdasi, the day on which Narakasura was killed by Krishna.

Many Hindus associate the festival with Goddess Lakshmi, the goddess of wealth and prosperity, and wife of Vishnu. According to Pintchman, the start of the 5-day Diwali festival is stated in some popular contemporary sources as the day Goddess Lakshmi was born from Samudra manthan, the churning of the cosmic ocean of milk by the Devas (gods) and the Asuras (demons) – a Vedic legend that is also found in several Puranas such as the Padma Purana, while the night of Diwali is when Lakshmi chose and wed Vishnu. Along with Lakshmi, who is representative of Vaishnavism, Ganesha, the elephant-headed son of Parvati and Shiva of Shaivism tradition, is remembered as one who symbolises ethical beginnings and the remover of obstacles.

Hindus of eastern India associate the festival with the Goddess Kali, who symbolises the victory of good over evil. Hindus from the Braj region in northern India, parts of Assam, as well as southern Tamil and Telugu communities view Diwali as the day the god Krishna overcame and destroyed the evil demon king Narakasura, in yet another symbolic victory of knowledge and good over ignorance and evil.

Trade and merchant families and others also offer prayers to Saraswati, who embodies music, literature and learning and Kubera, who symbolises book-keeping, treasury and wealth management. In western states such as Gujarat, and certain northern Hindu communities of India, the festival of Diwali signifies the start of a new year.

Mythical tales shared on Diwali vary widely depending on region and even within Hindu tradition, yet all share a common focus on righteousness, self-inquiry and the importance of knowledge, which, according to Lindsey Harlan, an Indologist and scholar of Religious Studies, is the path to overcoming the "darkness of ignorance". The telling of these myths are reminiscent of the Hindu belief that good ultimately triumphs over evil.

Other religions
Originally a Hindu festival, Diwali has transcended religious lines. Diwali is celebrated by Hindus, Jains, Sikhs, and Newar Buddhists, although for each faith it marks different historical events and stories, but nonetheless the festival represents the same symbolic victory of light over darkness, knowledge over ignorance, and good over evil.

Jainism 

A scholar of Jain and Nivethan, states that in Jain tradition, Diwali is celebrated in observance of "Mahavira Nirvana Divas", the physical death and final nirvana of Mahavira. The Jain Diwali celebrated in many parts of India has similar practices to the Hindu Diwali, such as the lighting of lamps and the offering of prayers to Lakshmi. However, the focus of the Jain Diwali remains the dedication to Mahavira. According to the Jain tradition, this practice of lighting lamps first began on the day of Mahavira's nirvana in 527 BCE, when 18 kings who had gathered for Mahavira's final teachings issued a proclamation that lamps be lit in remembrance of the "great light, Mahavira". This traditional belief of the origin of Diwali, and its significance to Jains, is reflected in their historic artworks such as paintings.

Sikhism 

Sikhs celebrate Bandi Chhor Divas in remembrance of the release of Guru Hargobind from the Gwalior Fort prison by the Mughal emperor Jahangir and the day he arrived at the Golden Temple in Amritsar. According to J.S. Grewal, a scholar of Sikhism and Sikh history, Diwali in the Sikh tradition is older than the sixth Guru Hargobind legend. Guru Amar Das, the third Guru of the Sikhs, built a well in Goindwal with eighty-four steps and invited Sikhs to bathe in its sacred waters on Baisakhi and Diwali as a form of community bonding. Over time, these spring and autumn festivals became the most important of Sikh festivals and holy sites such as Amritsar became focal points for annual pilgrimages. The festival of Diwali, according to Ray Colledge, highlights three events in Sikh history: the founding of the city of Amritsar in 1577, the release of Guru Hargobind from the Mughal prison, and the day of Bhai Mani Singh's martyrdom in 1738 as a result of his failure to pay a fine for trying to celebrate Diwali and thereafter refusing to convert to Islam.

Buddhism 
Diwali is not a festival for most Buddhists, with the exception of the Newar people of Nepal who revere various deities in Vajrayana Buddhism and celebrate Diwali by offering prayers to Lakshmi. Newar Buddhists in Nepalese valleys also celebrate the Diwali festival over five days, in much the same way, and on the same days, as the Nepalese Hindu Diwali-Tihar festival. According to some observers, this traditional celebration by Newar Buddhists in Nepal, through the worship of Lakshmi and Vishnu during Diwali, is not syncretism but rather a reflection of the freedom within Mahayana Buddhist tradition to worship any deity for their worldly betterment.

Celebrations
In the lead-up to Diwali, celebrants prepare by cleaning, renovating, and decorating their homes and workplaces with diyas (oil lamps) and rangolis (colorful art circle patterns). During Diwali, people wear their finest clothes, illuminate the interior and exterior of their homes with saaki (earthen lamp), diyas and rangoli, perform worship ceremonies of Lakshmi, the goddess of prosperity and wealth, light fireworks, and partake in family feasts, where mithai (sweets) and gifts are shared.

The height of Diwali is celebrated on the third day coinciding with the darkest night of Ashvin or Kartika.

The common celebratory practices are known as the festival of light, however there are minor differences from state to state in India. Diwali is usually celebrated twenty days after the Vijayadashami festival, with Dhanteras, or the regional equivalent, marking the first day of the festival when celebrants prepare by cleaning their homes and making decorations on the floor, such as rangolis. Some regions of India start Diwali festivities the day before Dhanteras with Govatsa Dwadashi. The second day is Naraka Chaturdashi. The third day is the day of Lakshmi Puja and the darkest night of the traditional month. In some parts of India, the day after Lakshmi Puja is marked with the Govardhan Puja and Balipratipada (Padwa). Some Hindu communities mark the last day as Bhai Dooj or the regional equivalent, which is dedicated to the bond between sister and brother, while other Hindu and Sikh craftsmen communities mark this day as Vishwakarma Puja and observe it by performing maintenance in their work spaces and offering prayers.Rituals and preparations for Diwali begin days or weeks in advance, typically after the festival of Dusshera that precedes Diwali by about 20 days. The festival formally begins two days before the night of Diwali, and ends two days thereafter. Each day has the following rituals and significance:

Dhanteras, Dhanatrayodashi, Yama Deepam (Day 1)

Dhanteras, derived from Dhan meaning wealth and teras meaning thirteenth, marks the thirteenth day of the dark fortnight of Ashwin or Kartik and the beginning of Diwali in most parts of India. On this day, many Hindus clean their homes and business premises. They install diyas, small earthen oil-filled lamps that they light up for the next five days, near Lakshmi and Ganesha iconography. Women and children decorate doorways within homes and offices with rangolis, colourful designs made from rice flour, flower petals, colored rice or colored sand, while the boys and men decorate the roofs and walls of family homes, markets, and temples and string up lights and lanterns. The day also marks a major shopping day to purchase new utensils, home equipment, jewelry, firecrackers, and other items. On the evening of Dhanteras, families offer prayers (puja) to Lakshmi and Ganesha, and lay offerings of puffed rice, candy toys, rice cakes and batashas (hollow sugar cakes).

According to Tracy Pintchman, Dhanteras is a symbol of annual renewal, cleansing and an auspicious beginning for the next year. The term Dhan for this day also alludes to the Ayurvedic icon Dhanvantari, the god of health and healing, who is believed to have emerged from the "churning of cosmic ocean" on the same day as Lakshmi. Some communities, particularly those active in Ayurvedic and health-related professions, pray or perform havan rituals to Dhanvantari on Dhanteras.

On Yama Deepam (also known as Yama Dipadana or Jam ke Diya), Hindus light a diya, ideally made of wheat flour and filled with sesame oil, that faces south in the back of their homes. This is believed to please Yama (Yamraj), the god of death, and to ward off untimely death. Some Hindus observe Yama Deepa on the second night before the main day of Diwali.

Naraka Chaturdashi, Kali Chaudas, Chhoti Diwali, Hanuman Puja, Roop Chaudas, Yama Deepam (Day 2)

Naraka Chaturdashi, also known as Chhoti Diwali, is the second day of festivities coinciding with the fourteenth day of the dark fortnight of Ashwin or Kartik. The term "chhoti" means little, while "Naraka" means hell and "Chaturdashi" means "fourteenth". The day and its rituals are interpreted as ways to liberate any souls from their suffering in "Naraka", or hell, as well as a reminder of spiritual auspiciousness. For some Hindus, it is a day to pray for the peace to the manes, or defiled souls of one's ancestors and light their way for their journeys in the cyclic afterlife. A mythological interpretation of this festive day is the destruction of the asura (demon) Narakasura by Krishna, a victory that frees 16,000 imprisoned princesses kidnapped by Narakasura. It is also celebrated as Roop Chaudas in some North Indian households, where women bathe before sunrise, while lighting a Diya (lamp) in the bath area, they believe it helps enhance their beauty – it is a fun ritual that young girls enjoy as part of festivities. Ubtan is applied by the women which is made up of special gram flour mixed with herbs for cleansing and beautifying themselves.

Naraka Chaturdashi is also a major day for purchasing festive foods, particularly sweets. A variety of sweets are prepared using flour, semolina, rice, chickpea flour, dry fruit pieces powders or paste, milk solids (mawa or khoya) and clarified butter (ghee). According to Goldstein, these are then shaped into various forms, such as laddus, barfis, halwa, kachoris, shrikhand, and sandesh, rolled and stuffed delicacies, such as karanji, shankarpali, maladu, susiyam, pottukadalai. Sometimes these are wrapped with edible silver foil (vark). Confectioners and shops create Diwali-themed decorative displays, selling these in large quantities, which are stocked for home celebrations to welcome guests and as gifts. Families also prepare homemade delicacies for Lakshmi Pujan, regarded as the main day of Diwali. Chhoti Diwali is also a day for visiting friends, business associates and relatives, and exchanging gifts.

On the second day of Diwali, Hanuman Puja is performed in some parts of India especially in Gujarat. It coincides with the day of Kali Chaudas. It is believed that spirits roam around on the night of Kali Chaudas, and Hanuman, who is the deity of strength, power, and protection, is worshipped to seek protection from the spirits. Diwali is also celebrated to mark the return of Rama to Ayodhya after defeating the demon-king Ravana and completing his fourteen years of exile. The devotion and dedication of Hanuman pleased Rama so much that he blessed Hanuman to be worshipped before him. Thus, people worship Hanuman the day before Diwali's main day.

This day is commonly celebrated as Diwali in Tamil Nadu, Goa, and Karnataka. Traditionally, Marathi Hindus and South Indian Hindus receive an oil massage from the elders in the family on the day and then take a ritual bath, all before sunrise. Many visit their favourite Hindu temple.

Some Hindus observe Yama Deepam (also known as Yama Dipadana or Jam ke Diya) on the second day of Diwali, instead of the first day. A diya that is filled with sesame oil is lit at back of their homes facing in the southern direction. This is believed to please Yama, the god of death, and to ward off untimely death.

Lakshmi Pujan, Kali Puja (Day 3)

The third day is the height of the festival, and coincides with the last day of the dark fortnight of Ashwin or Kartik. This is the day when Hindu, Jain and Sikh temples and homes are aglow with lights, thereby making it the "festival of lights". The word Deepawali comes from the Sanskrit word deep, which means an Indian lantern/lamp.

The youngest members in the family visit their elders, such as grandparents and other senior members of the community, on this day. Small business owners give gifts or special bonus payments to their employees between Dhanteras and Lakshmi Pujan. Shops either do not open or close early on this day allowing employees to enjoy family time. Shopkeepers and small operations perform puja rituals in their office premises. Unlike some other festivals, the Hindus typically do not fast during the five-day long Diwali including Lakshmi Pujan, rather they feast and share the bounties of the season at their workplaces, community centres, temples, and homes.

As the evening approaches, celebrants will wear new clothes or their best outfits, teenage girls and women, in particular, wear saris and jewelry. At dusk, family members gather for the Lakshmi Pujan, although prayers will also be offered to other deities, such as Ganesha, Saraswati, Rama, Lakshmana, Sita, Hanuman, or Kubera. The lamps from the puja ceremony are then used to light more earthenware lamps, which are placed in rows along the parapets of temples and houses, while some diyas are set adrift on rivers and streams. After the puja, people go outside and celebrate by lighting up patakhe (fireworks) together, and then share a family feast and mithai (sweets, desserts).

The puja and rituals in the Bengali Hindu community focus on Kali, the goddess of war, instead of Lakshmi. According to Rachel Fell McDermott, a scholar of South Asian, particular Bengali, studies, in Bengal during Navaratri (Dussehra elsewhere in India) the Durga puja is the main focus, although in the eastern and north eastern states the two are synonymous, but on Diwali the focus is on the puja dedicated to Kali. These two festivals likely developed in tandem over their recent histories, states McDermott. Textual evidence suggests that Bengali Hindus worshipped Lakshmi before the colonial era, and that the Kali puja is a more recent phenomenon. Contemporary Bengali celebrations mirror those found elsewhere, with teenage boys playing with fireworks and the sharing of festive food with family, but with the Shakti goddess Kali as the focus.

On the night of Diwali, rituals across much of India are dedicated to Lakshmi to welcome her into their cleaned homes and bring prosperity and happiness for the coming year. While the cleaning, or painting, of the home is in part for goddess Lakshmi, it also signifies the ritual "reenactment of the cleansing, purifying action of the monsoon rains" that would have concluded in most of the Indian subcontinent. Vaishnava families recite Hindu legends of the victory of good over evil and the return of hope after despair on the Diwali night, where the main characters may include Rama, Krishna, Vamana or one of the avatars of Vishnu, the divine husband of Lakshmi. At dusk, lamps placed earlier in the inside and outside of the home are lit up to welcome Lakshmi. Family members light up firecrackers, which some interpret as a way to ward off all evil spirits and the inauspicious, as well as add to the festive mood. According to Pintchman, who quotes Raghavan, this ritual may also be linked to the tradition in some communities of paying respect to ancestors. Earlier in the season's fortnight, some welcome the souls of their ancestors to join the family for the festivities with the Mahalaya. The Diwali night's lights and firecrackers, in this interpretation, represent a celebratory and symbolic farewell to the departed ancestral souls.

The celebrations and rituals of the Jains and the Sikhs are similar to those of the Hindus where social and community bonds are renewed. Major temples and homes are decorated with lights, festive foods shared with all, friends and relatives remembered and visited with gifts.

Annakut, Balipratipada (Padwa), Govardhan Puja (Day 4)

The day after Diwali is the first day of the bright fortnight of Kartik. It is regionally called Annakut (heap of grain), Padwa, Goverdhan puja, Bali Pratipada, Bali Padyami, Kartik Shukla Pratipada and other names. According to one tradition, the day is associated with the story of Bali's defeat at the hands of Vishnu. In another interpretation, it is thought to reference the legend of Parvati and her husband Shiva playing a game of dyuta (dice) on a board of twelve squares and thirty pieces, Parvati wins. Shiva surrenders his shirt and adornments to her, rendering him naked. According to Handelman and Shulman, as quoted by Pintchman, this legend is a Hindu metaphor for the cosmic process for creation and dissolution of the world through the masculine destructive power, as represented by Shiva, and the feminine procreative power, represented by Parvati, where twelve reflects the number of months in the cyclic year, while thirty are the number of days in its lunisolar month.

This day ritually celebrates the bond between the wife and husband, and in some Hindu communities, husbands will celebrate this with gifts to their wives. In other regions, parents invite a newly married daughter, or son, together with their spouses to a festive meal and give them gifts.

In some rural communities of the north, west and central regions, the fourth day is celebrated as Govardhan puja, honouring the legend of the Hindu god Krishna saving the cowherd and farming communities from incessant rains and floods triggered by Indra's anger, which he accomplished by lifting the Govardhan mountain. This legend is remembered through the ritual of building small mountain-like miniatures from cow dung. According to Kinsley, the ritual use of cow dung, a common fertiliser, is an agricultural motif and a celebration of its significance to annual crop cycles.

The agricultural symbolism is also observed on this day by many Hindus as Annakut, literally "mountain of food". Communities prepare over one hundred dishes from a variety of ingredients, which is then dedicated to Krishna before being shared among the community. Hindu temples on this day prepare and present "mountains of sweets" to the faithful who have gathered for darshan (visit). In Gujarat, Annakut is the first day of the new year and celebrated through the purchase of essentials, or sabras (literally, "good things in life"), such as salt, offering prayers to Krishna and visiting temples.

Bhai Duj, Bhau-Beej, Vishwakarma Puja (Day 5)

The last day of the festival, the second day of the bright fortnight of Kartik, is called Bhai Duj (literally "brother's day"), Bhau Beej, Bhai Tilak or Bhai Phonta. It celebrates the sister-brother bond, similar in spirit to Raksha Bandhan but it is the brother that travels to meet the sister and her family. This festive day is interpreted by some to symbolise Yama's sister Yamuna welcoming Yama with a tilaka, while others interpret it as the arrival of Krishna at his sister Subhadra's place after defeating Narakasura. Subhadra welcomes him with a tilaka on his forehead.

The day celebrates the sibling bond between brother and sister. On this day the womenfolk of the family gather, perform a puja with prayers for the well being of their brothers, then return to a ritual of feeding their brothers with their hands and receiving gifts. According to Pintchman, in some Hindu traditions the women recite tales where sisters protect their brothers from enemies that seek to cause him either bodily or spiritual harm. In historic times, this was a day in autumn when brothers would travel to meet their sisters, or invite their sister's family to their village to celebrate their sister-brother bond with the bounty of seasonal harvests.

The artisan Hindu and Sikh community celebrates the fourth day as the Vishwakarma puja day. Vishwakarma is the presiding Hindu deity for those in architecture, building, manufacturing, textile work and crafts trades.  The looms, tools of trade, machines and workplaces are cleaned and prayers offered to these livelihood means.

Other traditions and significance
During the season of Diwali, numerous rural townships and villages host melas, or fairs, where local producers and artisans trade produce and goods. A variety of entertainments are usually available for inhabitants of the local community to enjoy. The women, in particular, adorn themselves in colourful attire and decorate their hands with henna. Such events are also mentioned in Sikh historical records. In the modern day, Diwali mela are held at college, or university, campuses or as community events by members of the Indian diaspora. At such events a variety of music, dance and arts performances, food, crafts, and cultural celebrations are featured.

Economics
Diwali marks a major shopping period in India, and is comparable to the Christmas period in terms of consumer purchases and economic activity. It is traditionally a time when households purchase new clothing, home refurbishments, gifts, gold, jewelry, and other large purchases particularly as the festival is dedicated to Lakshmi, the goddess of wealth and prosperity, and such purchases are considered auspicious. According to Rao, Diwali is one of the major festivals where rural Indians spend a significant portion of their annual income, and is a means for them to renew their relationships and social networks. 

Other goods that are bought in substantial quantities during Diwali include confectionery and fireworks. Stock markets like NSE and BSE in India are typically closed during Diwali, with the exception of a Diwali Muhurat trading session for an hour in the evening to coincide with the beginning of the new year. In 2020, the INDF ETF was launched to mark the start of Diwali.

Politics

Diwali has increasingly attracted cultural exchanges, becoming occasions for politicians and religious leaders worldwide to meet Hindu or Indian origin citizens, diplomatic staff or neighbours. Many participate in other socio-political events as a symbol of support for diversity and inclusiveness. The Catholic dicastery Pontifical Council for Interreligious Dialogue, founded as Secretariat for non-Christians by Pope Paul VI, began sending official greetings and the Pope's message to the Hindus on Diwali in the mid-1990s.

Many governments encourage or sponsor Diwali-related festivities in their territories. For example, the Singaporean government, in association with the Hindu Endowment Board of Singapore, organises many cultural events during Diwali every year. National and civic leaders such as the former Prince Charles have attended Diwali celebrations at prominent Hindu temples in the UK, such as the Swaminarayan Temple in Neasden, using the occasion to highlight contributions of the Hindu community to British society. Since 2009, Diwali has been celebrated every year at 10 Downing Street, the residence of the British Prime Minister.

Diwali was first celebrated in the White House by George W. Bush in 2003 and its religious and historical significance was officially recognized by the United States Congress in 2007. Barack Obama became the first president to personally attend Diwali at the White House in 2009. On the eve of his first visit to India as President of the United States, Obama released an official statement sharing his best wishes with "those celebrating Diwali".

Every year during Diwali, Indian forces approach their Pakistani counterparts at the border bearing gifts of traditional Indian confectionery, a gesture that is returned in kind by the Pakistani soldiers who give Pakistani sweets to the Indian soldiers.

Issues

Burn injuries

The use of fireworks also causes an increase in the number of burn injuries in India during Diwali. One particular firework called anar (fountain) has been found to be responsible for 65% of such injuries, with adults being the typical victims. Most of the injuries sustained are Group I type burns (minor) requiring only outpatient care.

Air pollution

The use of firecrackers on Diwali increases the concentration of dust and pollutants in the air. After firing, the fine dust particles get settled on the surrounding surfaces which are packed with chemicals like copper, zinc, sodium, lead, magnesium, cadmium and pollutants like oxides of sulfur and nitrogen. These invisible yet harmful particles affect the environment and in turn, put people's health at stake.

During Diwali, the levels of suspended particulate matter increase. When people are exposed to these pollutant particles, they may suffer from eye, nose, and throat-related problems. To produce colors when crackers are burst,  carcinogenic and poisonous elements are used. When these compounds pollute the air, they increase the risk of cancer in people. Firecrackers also cause light pollution.

See also

 Bandna – Agrarian festival that coincides with Diwali
 Bandi Chhor Divas – Sikh festival that coincides with Diwali
 Day of the Little Candles - the Colombian Catholic festival of candles
 Diwali (Jainism) – Diwali's significance in Jainism
 Galungan – the Balinese Hindu festival of dharma's victory over adharma
 Guy Fawkes Night - the British festival of bonfires and fireworks held on the first weekend of November. In towns with a large British Asian community, Diwali and Guy Fawkes festivities are often combined.
 Hanukkah – the Jewish festival of lights
 Kali Puja – Diwali is most commonly known as Kali Puja in West Bengal or in Bengali dominated areas
 Karthikai Deepam – the festival of lights observed by Tamils of Tamil Nadu, Puducherry, Kerala, Sri Lanka and elsewhere
 Lehyam, often prepared on the occasion of Deepavali to aid the digestion
 Lantern Festival – the Chinese festival of lanterns
 Saint Lucy's Day – the Christian festival of lights
 Sohrai – Harvest festival that coincides with Diwali
 Swanti – Newar version of Diwali
 Tihar – Nepali version of Diwali
 Walpurgis Night – the German festival of bonfires

Notes

References

Bibliography

External links

 The Ancient Origins of Diwali, India’s Biggest Holiday, Becky Little (2017)
 Deepawali

 
Autumn festivals
Festivals in India
Festivals in Nepal
Fireworks events in Asia
Harvest festivals in India
Hindu festivals
Jain festivals
November observances
October observances
Hindu festivals in India
Festivals in Jharkhand
Public holidays in Fiji
Public holidays in India
Public holidays in Malaysia
Public holidays in Mauritius
Public holidays in Nepal
Public holidays in Singapore
Public holidays in Sri Lanka
Public holidays in Trinidad and Tobago
Religious festivals in India
Sikh festivals
Traditions involving fire
Public holidays in Myanmar
Buddhist festivals